"Have a good time" is a colloquial catch-phrase. It may also refer to:

 Have a Good Time, an album by Al Green
"Have a Good Time", a song by Paul Simon
"Have a Good Time", a song by Morning Runner